Maurice Del Mue (1875 – January 24, 1955) was a French-born American illustrator, poster artist, and painter. He worked for the San Francisco Chronicle and Foster & Kleiser, and he had a studio in Forest Knolls, Marin County, California.

Life
Del Mue was born in 1875 in Paris, France, and he emigrated to the United States at age 7. He was trained at the San Francisco Art Association and the École des Beaux-Arts.

Del Mue began his career as an illustrator for the San Francisco Chronicle in the 1920s. He designed posters for Foster & Kleiser until 1941, when he established his studio in Forest Knolls, Marin County and he joined the Society of Marin Artists. He painted murals at Tamalpais High School, the College of Marin, and the officers' lounge of the Hamilton Army Airfield.

Del Mue died on January 24, 1955, in Forest Knolls, at age 79. One of his paintings is at the Worcester Art Museum.

References

1875 births
1955 deaths
Painters from Paris
French emigrants to the United States
People from Marin County, California
École des Beaux-Arts alumni
American illustrators
American poster artists
American muralists
Painters from California
20th-century American painters